Aravinn Thevarr A/L Gunasegaran (born 4 October 1993) is a Malaysian sprinter who primarily competes in the 100 metres and 200 metres.

International competitions

References

1993 births
Living people
Malaysian male sprinters
People from Perak
Malaysian people of Indian descent
Southeast Asian Games medalists in athletics
Southeast Asian Games bronze medalists for Malaysia
Competitors at the 2017 Southeast Asian Games